Koongine Cave is located in the Limestone Coast of South Australia.

Finger markings made by Indigenous Australians can be found on the walls of the cave.

References

Caves of South Australia
Archaeological sites in South Australia
Australian Aboriginal cultural history
Limestone Coast